The Honduras national U-17 football team represents Honduras in tournaments and friendly matches at the Under-17 level. They have qualified for five FIFA U-17 World Cups, with their best performance being in 2013 where they reached the Quarter-finals. They have also qualified for the 2015 FIFA U-17 World Cup in Chile.

Tournament history

FIFA U-17 World Cup

CONCACAF U-17 championship record

2007 CONCACAF U-17 Championship

Group A

2007 FIFA U-17 World Cup

Group C

The 2007 FIFA Under 17 World Cup was the debut tournament for the mini H. In their first game against Spain, Christian Martínez and Roger Rojas managed to score two goals. Despite the team's effort they lost 4-2 and went on to face Argentina, which had surprisingly drawn against Syria. The mini H lost 4-1 with captain, Johnny Leveron, scoring the only and final goal of the tournament by means of a penalty kick. The final game, to complete their World Cup journey, was a defeat 2-0 at hands of Syria.

2009 CONCACAF U-17 Championship

Group A

2009 FIFA U-17 World Cup

Group A

The Honduran youngsters finished in last place of Group A, losing close games to Argentina and Nigeria 0–1 each, and losing 1–3 to Germany. Anthony Lozano scored the lone goal.

Fixtures and results

Current squad
The following players were selected for the 2017 FIFA U-17 World Cup.
Head coach: José Valladares

Recent call-ups

Record v other nations
 As of 12 May 2019
 Includes data from CONCACAF U-17 Championship and FIFA U-17 World Cup only

Honours
 CONCACAF Under-17 Championship
 Runners-up (1): 2015

Managers
 Luis "Piña" López (1983)
 Quique Grey (1985)
 Mario Griffin Cubas (1987)
 Carlos Padilla Velásquez (1988)
 Ricardo Taylor (1991)
 José Raúl Ortiz (1992 and 1994)
 Carlos Cruz Carranza (1996)
 Hermelindo Cantarero (1998-1999)
 Óscar "Cocli" Salgado (2000)
 Dennis Marlon Allen (2001)
 Carlos Ramón Tábora (2002)
 Miguel Ángel Escalante (2004 and 2005)
 Óscar "Cocli" Salgado (2006)
 Miguel Ángel Escalante (2007)
 Jorge Jiménez (2008)
 Emilio Umanzor (2008-2011)

References

Central American national under-17 association football teams
Under-17